The 2021–22 Moldovan Cup was the 31st season of the annual Moldovan football cup competition. The competition started on 17 August 2021 with the preliminary round and concluded with the final on 21 May 2022.

Format and Schedule
The preliminary round and the first two rounds proper are regionalised to reduce teams travel costs.

Participating clubs
The following teams qualified for the competition:

Preliminary round
10 clubs from the Divizia B entered this round. Teams that finished higher on the league in the previous season played their ties away. 16 clubs from the Divizia B received a bye for the preliminary round. Matches were played on 17 August 2021.

First round
21 clubs from the Divizia B and 11 clubs from the Divizia A entered this round. In a match, the home advantage was granted to the team from the lower league. If two teams are from the same division, the team that finished higher on the league in the previous season played their tie away. Matches were played on 24 August 2021.

Second round
The 16 winners from the previous round entered this round. In a match, the home advantage was granted to the team from the lower league. If two teams are from the same division, the team that finished higher on the league in the previous season played their tie away. Matches were played on 14 September 2021.

Final stage

Bracket

Round of 16
The 8 winners from the previous round and 8 clubs from the Divizia Națională entered this round. The home teams and the pairs were determined in a draw held on 20 September 2021. Matches were played on 26 and 27 October 2021.

Quarter-finals
The 8 winners from the previous round entered the quarter-finals. The home teams were determined in a draw held on 29 October 2021. Matches were played on 12 and 13 April 2022.

Semi-finals
The 4 winners from the previous round entered the semi-finals. The home teams were determined in a draw held on 15 April 2022. Matches were played on 26 April 2022.

Final

The final was played on Saturday 21 May 2022 at the Nisporeni Stadium in Nisporeni. The "home" team (for administrative purposes) was determined by an additional draw held on 28 April 2022.

References

External links
Cupa Moldovei on Soccerway

Moldovan Cup seasons
Moldova
2021–22 in Moldovan football